Esmail Sara (also Romanized as Esmāʿīl Sarā; also known as Esmāeelsarā) is a village in Divshal Rural District, in the Central District of Langarud County, Gilan Province, Iran. At the 2006 census, its population was 67, in 20 families.

References 

Populated places in Langarud County